John Wilson (born 7 July 1957) is a New Zealand former cricketer. He played 33 first-class and 19 List A matches for Otago between 1982 and 1989.

See also
 List of Otago representative cricketers

References

External links
 

1957 births
Living people
New Zealand cricketers
Otago cricketers
Cricketers from Invercargill